Sirohi Point is a rock point at the north side of the terminus of Alice Glacier, where the latter enters Beardmore Glacier. Named by Advisory Committee on Antarctic Names (US-ACAN) after Giri Raj Singh Sirohi, United States Antarctic Research Program (USARP) biologist at McMurdo Station, 1960–61.

Headlands of the Ross Dependency
Dufek Coast